James Westmore Brittain (February 8, 1886 – March 12, 1961) was a Canadian politician. He served in the Legislative Assembly of New Brunswick as member of the Liberal party from 1948 to 1952.

References

1880s births
1961 deaths
20th-century Canadian legislators
New Brunswick Liberal Association MLAs
Politicians from Saint John, New Brunswick